Fernando Miguel Carralero García (born 16 May 1986) is a Spanish footballer who plays for Lincoln Red Imps F.C. as a midfielder.

References

External links
 Fernando Carralero Interview

1986 births
Living people
People from San Fernando, Cádiz
Sportspeople from the Province of Cádiz
Spanish footballers
Association football midfielders
Segunda División B players
Tercera División players
Betis Deportivo Balompié footballers
Lucena CF players
CE Sabadell FC footballers
UD Almería B players
Arroyo CP players
Chiclana CF players
Conil CF players
Burgos CF footballers
CD Ebro players
San Fernando CD players
CD El Ejido players
CD Calahorra players
Liga I players
FC Botoșani players
Gibraltar Premier Division players
Lincoln Red Imps F.C. players
Spanish expatriate footballers
Expatriate footballers in Romania
Expatriate footballers in Gibraltar
Spanish expatriate sportspeople in Romania
Spanish expatriate sportspeople in Gibraltar